Owch Darreh-ye Moghanlu Ogham Ali (also Romanized as Owch Darreh-ye Moghānlū Oghām ʿAlī; also known as Owch Darreh, Qeshlāq-e Pākdel, and Ūch Daraq-e ‘Olyā) is a village in Qeshlaq-e Sharqi Rural District, Qeshlaq Dasht District, Bileh Savar County, Ardabil Province, Iran. At the 2006 census, its population was 144, in 26 families.

References 

Towns and villages in Bileh Savar County